Crničani is a village in the municipality of Dojran, North Macedonia.

Demographics
According to the 2002 census, the village had a total of 221 inhabitants. Ethnic groups in the village include:

Macedonians 189
Serbs 29
Others 3

References

Villages in Dojran Municipality